The 2000–01 Mestis season was the first season of the Mestis, the second level of ice hockey in Finland. 12 teams participated in the league, and Jukurit won the championship.

Standings

Playoffs

Qualification

External links
 Season on hockeyarchives.info

Fin
2000–01 in Finnish ice hockey
Mestis seasons